FC Real Odesa was a professional football club based in Odesa, Ukraine.

History 

The club was established in December 2002 in Odesa under the premise of a sports school who were fans of Real Madrid was created on the initiative of members of the Odesa City Council Serhiy and Anatoly Dire.

The team participated in the 2003 Odesa city championship and also in the Ukrainian Football Amateur League. The team also won the Winter Championship in Odesa (2003–2004) and the Odessa City Cup (2003).

The team applied for a professional license and were granted one. Real Odesa entered the Ukrainian Second League for the 2004–05 season. Before the 2005–06 season the club withdrew their professional license.

The club colors were white and black.

League and cup history 

{|class="wikitable"
|-bgcolor="#efefef"
! Season
! Div.
! Pos.
! Pl.
! W
! D
! L
! GS
! GA
! P
!Domestic Cup
!colspan=2|Europe
!Notes
|-bgcolor=PowderBlue
|align=center|2004–05
|align=center|3rd "B"
|align=center|7
|align=center|26
|align=center|9
|align=center|10
|align=center|7
|align=center|25
|align=center|27
|align=center|37
|align=center|1/32 finals
|align=center|
|align=center|
|align=center|
|}

References 

Real Odesa
Real Odesa
Association football clubs established in 2002
Association football clubs disestablished in 2005
2002 establishments in Ukraine
2005 disestablishments in Ukraine